The Jeffersonian was an all-coach passenger train operated by the Pennsylvania Railroad between New York City, Washington, D.C., and St. Louis. Inaugurated in 1941, the services equaled that of the Trail Blazer, and it was equipped with modernized coaches, twin diners, and observation cars. In 1948, it was re-equipped with new lightweight cars and given a unique car, a recreation car, complete with a movie theater, game tables, and a playpen for kids. In 1956, the Jeffersonian was discontinued, and its cars went to other trains. Its coaches went to the Indianapolis Limited and Spirit of St. Louis (breaking that train's all-Pullman status). In addition, the General started carrying through cars to Washington, D.C. Its recreation car went to the Penn Texas.

References

Named passenger trains of the United States
Railway services introduced in 1941
Passenger trains of the Pennsylvania Railroad
Railway services discontinued in 1956